Shadow Play is a 1986 American supernatural horror film directed by Susan Shadburne and starring Dee Wallace and Cloris Leachman. It follows a playwright who lost her fiancé seven years prior. She begins having reoccurring dreams about his death and suffers from writer's block. The film centers around the lighthouse where the tragedy took place. Throughout the film there are many subtle lighthouse effects and references. The Shadow Play within the story itself is literally a timing of each beat after another on the spinning of the beacon light of the lantern room.

Plot
Morgan Hanna wakes up in the middle of the night after having nightmares involving the sudden death of her fiancé Jeremy, seven years ago. Struggling to write a comical play and struggling to find inspiration, she talks to a therapist who informs her that this is all just beginning. In his wisdom he expresses that it's not over judging by the way she is still heavily affected by his death. The nightmares continue to haunt her.

After receiving a heartfelt letter from her would-be mother-in-law inviting her back to the Northwest where the tragedy took place, Morgan opts to face what she's running away from and stays with Jeremy's mother who is also affected by his death as well as her own husband's death. While settling in, Morgan begins to formulate a play about the loss of her beloved and the text takes on an almost supernatural tone. Morgan begins to see Jeremy's reflection in windows and mirrors.

Jeremy's brother John still confirms that Jeremy killed himself as he was the only one present when Jeremy fell from the lighthouse. Everyone has been made to believe that is what happened.

The five actors who read for the play are all playing different parts of the same character. At first the character appears to be Morgan herself, but as it progresses it becomes more the character of Jeremy from beyond. Jeremy is the one writing the play from beyond the grave.

As the underlying drama unfolds, Morgan begins to unravel thinking she is losing her mind. As the play progresses it takes on a far more supernatural tone and John uses her vulnerability to seduce her while Jeremy uses John's body to be with Morgan again. Morgan becomes even more distraught and finally breaks down. Submitting to the idea of joining Jeremy to end her pain. She is determined to finish the play, and the ending takes on the meaning that she will end her own life as she believed Jeremy had done. She hands the finished script to her five actors and sits through the full reading of the play. Satisfied and moved by the performance, she heads for the lighthouse to jump to her death. John follows her, desperate to stop her. As John tries to explain that Jeremy wouldn't want this, she starts to stir from her catatonic state. He tells her that Jeremy never killed himself and that she didn't fail him. That it was truly an accident that he caused when he attempted to take his own life and Jeremy fell in the process of trying to stop him from jumping.

Now fully aware that everything she was led to believe was a lie and that she wasn't at fault, her own spirit is freed in a sense. She flees from the lighthouse, relieved of years in doubt. With a newfound resolution, she tells her agent over the phone that she is returning home. Waiting for her in her room is Jeremy's last words to her from beyond. Telling Morgan to be free and happy.

Cast
 Dee Wallace as Morgan Hanna
 Cloris Leachman as Millie Crown
 Ron Kuhlman as John Crown
 Barry Laws as Jeremy Crown
 Delia Salvi as Bette
 Susan Dixon as Zelda
 Al Strobel as Byron

Production
Filming took place in late 1984 in Portland, Oregon and the San Juan Islands in Washington.

Home media
Shadow Play was released on VHS on October 10, 1991, by Starmaker Video. It also aired often on cable TV during the 1980s. The film was released as part of a 6-film DVD set entitled Horror Collection Extravaganza: 6 Terrifying Movies on September 4, 2012. On May 20, 2020, a newly restored edition of the film was released for the first time on Blu-ray by Scorpion Releasing.

References

External links
 
  
  
 Moria's Review
 Hollywood.com Movies
 Fan-made video set to music

1986 films
1986 horror films
American ghost films
Films about writers
Films shot in Portland, Oregon
Films shot in Washington (state)
Films set in Washington (state)
New World Pictures films
1980s supernatural horror films
1980s ghost films
American supernatural horror films
1980s English-language films
1980s American films